Agostino may refer to:

Agostino (name)
Agostino (film), an Italian film directed by Mauro Bolognini
Agostino (novel), a short novel by Alberto Moravia
, an Italian coaster

See also
Agostini (disambiguation)
D'Agostino (disambiguation)
Augustino (disambiguation)